Seaton is a historic house located near South Boston, Halifax County, Virginia. It was built in 1856–57, and is a -story, gable roofed wood frame dwelling set on a stone and brick foundation in the Gothic Revival style.  It was enlarged by a -story addition and kitchen wing in 1887.  Also on the property is a contributing carriage shed and shed.

It was listed on the National Register of Historic Places in 1980.

References

Houses on the National Register of Historic Places in Virginia
Carpenter Gothic houses in Virginia
Houses completed in 1857
Houses in Halifax County, Virginia
National Register of Historic Places in Halifax County, Virginia
1857 establishments in Virginia
U.S. Route 501